The election for the Hong Kong deputies to the 14th National People's Congress (NPC) was held on 15 December 2022. 36 Hong Kong deputies were elected by an electoral college composed of 1,420 members.

Electoral method
Article 21 of the Hong Kong Basic Law stipulates:

Chinese citizens who are residents of the Hong Kong Special Administrative Region shall be entitled to participate in the management of state affairs according to law.

In accordance with the assigned number of seats and the selection method specified by the National People's Congress, the Chinese citizens among the residents of the Hong Kong Special Administrative Region shall locally elect deputies of the Region to the National People's Congress to participate in the work of the highest organ of state power.

The Standing Committee of the National People's Congress (Standing Committee of NPC) decided in March 2022 that the electoral college is to compose of the Chinese nationals of the Election Committee (which elects the Chief Executive of Hong Kong). The number of electorates was therefore at 1,420, down from 1,423 announced in September 2022 due to death and various issues.

This election adopted block voting system. Each electorate shall vote for 36 candidates, i.e. the number of open seats.

Pre-election events 
Tam Yiu-chung, Hong Kong's sole delegate to the Standing Committee of NPC, has announced his decision to step down and will not stand in the NPC's election because of his age. At least three more incumbents also decided not to seek re-election, including Lo Sui-on, Wong Yuk-shan, and Martin Liao.

Media also reported Carrie Lam, the former Chief Executive, may be vying for an NPC seat and tipped to succeed Tam.

During the first briefing about the election, Yang Zhenwu, secretary general of the Standing Committee of NPC, said the elected deputies will play a bigger role in the governance of China, and warned against any attempts to infiltrate or sabotage Chinese authorities through the election. The briefing also approved a list of 19 presidium members, but did not include Carrie Lam nor Tung Chee-hwa.

Members of presidium are as follows:
 John Lee, Chief Executive of Hong Kong [chairman of presidium]
 Leung Chun-ying, former Chief Executive of Hong Kong
 Regina Ip, convenor of Executive Council
 Tam Yiu-chung, delegate to Standing Committee of NPC
 Maria Tam, former convenor of NPC Hong Kong delegation [spokesman of presidium]
 Martin Liao, member of Legislative Council and Executive Council, convenor of pro-Beijing camp
 Kenneth Lau, member of Legislative Council and Executive Council
 Chan Kin-por, member of Legislative Council and Executive Council
 Arthur Li, member of Executive Council
 Ko Wing-man, member of Executive Council
 Margaret Chan, former Director-General of World Health Organization
 Lo Sui-on
 Lee Chack-fan
 Ng Leung-ho
 Yu Kwok-chun
 Peter Lam
 Lam Shuk-yee
 Wong Yuk-shan
 Jonathan Choi Koon-shum

On 8 December, John Lee, chairman of presidium, confirmed 42 hopefuls, out of 47 that obtained an application form, had secured enough nomination and became candidates of the election.

BNO controversies 
A total of 21 delegates did not seek reelection, including some of the prominent businessman. Financial Times later reported in March 2023 that Chinese officials told politicians and tycoons wishing to run in this election to renounce passports or travel documents from countries including the UK, with a message that "either you give it up or you don’t run". While China had previously said that British National (Overseas) passport holders were eligible for the election, at least one NPC delegate intending to seek another term was reportedly denied a seat because of this, which was confirmed by local media HK01. The British report cited the threat of "foreign forces" and "questions of loyalty" as the rationale behind.

Election result
The voting took place at 10 am local time on 15 December and lasted for an hour. 1,273 electors cast their ballots, meaning more than 150 were absent, including Ko Wing-man and Martin Liao of the presidium. Ballot from 6 voters were rejected.

Neuroscientist Nancy Ip, President of the Hong Kong University of Science and Technology, secured the most votes. All 15 incumbents retained their seats, including Nancy Ip, Cally Kwong, Ma Fung-kwok, Herman Hu, Tim Lui, Li Yinquan, Dennis Lam, Bunny Chan, Nicholas Chan, Chan Yung, Ng Chau-pei, Maggie Chan, Henry Cai, Andrew Yao, Tommy Li.

Amongst the 21 new members are youth group representatives, ex-Transport Secretary Frank Chan, and former Government Chief Information Officer Allen Yeung. Seven Legislative Council members were elected for the first time, namely Starry Lee, Priscilla Leung, Chan Chun-ying, Kennedy Wong, Rock Chen, Kenneth Fok, and Jimmy Ng, therefore increasing the total of MPs in the delegation to 12. Six members of the Chinese People's Political Consultative Conference successfully earned a seat in the NPC.

Another six candidates lost, including Tse Oi-hung, vice-president of the Federation of Trade Unions, and Andrew Fan, son of former NPC Standing Committee member Rita Fan. Five of them are listed as supplementary members.

The list of elected delegates was submitted to the NPC's Candidate Eligibility Review Committee for review, and the results will be announced after their candidacies have been approved.

Elected members (36)

 Ginny Man Wing-yee
 Chu Lap-wai
 Nancy Chu Ip Yuk-yu
 Jimmy Ng Wing-ka
 Stanley Ng Chau-pei
 Li Yinquan
 Lee Shing-put
 Starry Lee Wai-king
 Tommy Li Ying-sang
 Wilson Shum Ho-kit
 Hendrick Sin
 Gordon Lam Chi-wing
 Dennis Lam Shun-chiu
 Andrew Yao Cho-fai
 Herman Hu Shao-ming
 Ling Yu-shih
 Kelvin Sun Wei-yung
 Eileen Tsui Li
 Ma Fung-kwok
 Priscilla Leung Mei-fun
 Frank Chan Fan
 Brave Chan Yung
 Rock Chen Chung-nin
 Ronick Chan Chun-ying
 Bunny Chan Chung-bun
 Maggie Chan Man-ki
 Nicholas Chan Hiu-fung
 Wong Ping-fan
 Kennedy Wong Ying-ho
 Wong Kam-leung
 Allen Yeung Tak-bun
 Tim Lui Tim-leung
 George Lau Ka-keung
 Henry Cai Yi
 Kenneth Fok Kai-kong
 Cally Kwong Mei-wan

Supplementary members (5)

 William Shum Wai-lam
 Sammy Lam Tin-hang
 Andrew Fan Chun-wah
 Daniel Chan Ching-yan
 Tse Oi-hung

Defeated candidate (1)
Edwin Cheng Kwok-kit won less than one-third of votes cast and became the only candidate not elected nor listed as supplementary member.

Detailed result

Result by party
Hong Kong local parties are not counted as national political parties and thus the below elected deputies will not carry their membership in the National People's Congress.

References

2022 elections in China
2022 in Hong Kong
NPC
December 2022 events in China